Tukkanatti  is a Village in the southern state of Karnataka, India. It is located in the Gokak taluk of Belagavi district in Karnataka.

Demographics
 India census, Tukkanatti had a population of 8039 with 4103 males and 3936 females.

See also
 Belgaum
 Districts of Karnataka

References

External links
 http://Belgaum.nic.in/

Villages in Belagavi district